Veselin Lyubomirov (born 2 February 1996) is a Bulgarian footballer who plays as a  defender or winger.

Career
In July 2017, Lyubomirov joined Second League club Lokomotiv Gorna Oryahovitsa.  He left at the end of the 2017–18 season.

In June 2018, Lyubomirov signed with Pirin Blagoevgrad.

Career statistics

Club

References

External links

1996 births
Living people
Bulgarian footballers
Association football midfielders
PFC Ludogorets Razgrad II players
PFC Ludogorets Razgrad players
PFC Akademik Svishtov players
FC Lokomotiv Gorna Oryahovitsa players
OFC Pirin Blagoevgrad players
PFC Marek Dupnitsa players
FC Septemvri Simitli players
PFC Spartak Varna players
First Professional Football League (Bulgaria) players
Second Professional Football League (Bulgaria) players
Bulgaria youth international footballers
People from Dupnitsa
Sportspeople from Kyustendil Province